Kathleen Norris Stark Caruso, professionally known as Kathi Norris (June 1, 1919 – June 15, 2005) was an American writer and television presenter.

Career
Born in Newark, Ohio, Norris was the daughter of Edwin Oliver (or Earl) Norris by his marriage to Lena Adelaide Loyd. Her father was a woodworker and cabinetmaker, and also a musician, playing the French horn and the viola in the Newark Symphony Orchestra. She had an older sister, Helen, who became a schoolteacher, and three older brothers, Carl, Donald, and Lowell Norris. The family were Presbyterians.<ref>Andrew Devore Boyd, Joseph Boyd, Sr. (died 1799) of Prince George's County, Maryland, and his family through six generations' (2010), p. 34: '221. Lena A. Loyd'</ref>

Kathi Norris became an advertising executive at W. R. Grace in Chicago and a radio writer, marrying Wilbur Stark in 1945. She hosted the first daytime talk show on WABD, the DuMont Television Network flagship TV station in New York City. The show was known by the alternate titles Kathi Norris' Television Shopper,  TV Shopper , and Your Television Shopper, which ran on DuMont from November 1, 1948 to December 1, 1950, and as The Kathi Norris Show which ran from 1950 to 1955 on DuMont, and on ABC from 1955 to 1957.

When her father died in 1957, she was living in Bronxville, New York.

Norris also was host of the DuMont game show Spin the Picture (4 June 1949 - 4 February 1950), and was host of the syndicated TV series True Story (1957–1961) produced by her husband Wilbur Stark (1912–1995). Norris also appeared in the TV series Modern Romances (NBC, 1954) and did occasional women's segments for The Today Show with Dave Garroway. Model and film actress Koo Stark is her daughter with Stark. Norris was married to 1950s TV host Carl Caruso from 1979 until her death. She and Caruso had co-hosted Spin the Picture. Her husband died in 2001.

Norris died in London in June 2005, aged 86, survived by her children Pamela Stark-Guyer, Kathleen (Koo) Stark, and Wilbur B. Stark, three stepchildren, five grandchildren, and two great-grandchildren.

See also
List of programs broadcast by the DuMont Television Network
List of surviving DuMont Television Network broadcasts

References

 

Bibliography
David Weinstein, The Forgotten Network: DuMont and the Birth of American Television (Philadelphia: Temple University Press, 2004)
Alex McNeil, Total Television, Fourth edition (New York: Penguin Books, 1980) 
Tim Brooks and Earle Marsh, The Complete Directory to Prime Time Network TV Shows'', Third edition (New York: Ballantine Books, 1964)

External links

1919 births
2005 deaths
American television hosts
American women television presenters
People from Newark, Ohio
20th-century American women
20th-century American people